Unn Aarrestad (born 23 June 1938 in Klepp) is a Norwegian politician for the Centre Party.

She was elected to the Norwegian Parliament from Rogaland in 1993, but was not re-elected in 1997. She served in the position of deputy representative during the terms 1981–1985, 1985–1989, 1989–1993 and 1997–2001. From 1997 to 2000, however, she met as a regular representative meanwhile Magnhild Meltveit Kleppa was appointed to the first cabinet Bondevik.

Aarrestad was a member of Time municipal council from 1975 to 1979, and of Rogaland county council from 1975 to 1993. She was a member of the central party board from 1981 to 1989.

Outside politics she spent most of her career as a farmer.

References 

1938 births
Living people
People from Klepp
Members of the Storting
Centre Party (Norway) politicians
Rogaland politicians
Norwegian farmers
Women members of the Storting
21st-century Norwegian politicians
21st-century Norwegian women politicians
20th-century Norwegian politicians
20th-century Norwegian women politicians